Charles Durwin Parker (December 27, 1827December 27, 1925) was an American farmer, politician, and Wisconsin pioneer.  He served as the 12th Lieutenant Governor of Wisconsin, and represented St. Croix in the Wisconsin State Assembly in 1869 and 1870.

Career
Parker was born in Coos County, New Hampshire, in 1827; his family moved to Waukesha County, Wisconsin Territory, in 1836. Parker then moved to the town of Pleasant Valley, St. Croix County, Wisconsin. Parker served as chairman of the Pleasant Valley Town Board and on the St. Croix County Board of Supervisors. He served as a Democrat in the Wisconsin State Assembly from 1869 to 1870 and served two terms as the 12th Lieutenant Governor of Wisconsin, from 1874 until 1878 under Governors William Taylor and Harrison Ludington. From 1880 until 1888 he was a regent of the University of Wisconsin, and from 1880 until 1895 a member of the Wisconsin Board of Control. He died on his 98th birthday, December 27, 1925, in River Falls, Wisconsin.

Family
Parker was the son of Luther Parker, the Justice of the Peace of the Republic of Indian Stream.

References

Further reading

External links

1827 births
1925 deaths
People from Coös County, New Hampshire
People from St. Croix County, Wisconsin
People from Waukesha County, Wisconsin
County supervisors in Wisconsin
Mayors of places in Wisconsin
Democratic Party members of the Wisconsin State Assembly
Lieutenant Governors of Wisconsin